Harold Allan Wilson (22 January 1885 – 17 May 1932) was an English runner. Born in Horncastle, Lincolnshire he was a member of the Hallamshire Harriers in Sheffield. He competed at the 1908 Summer Olympics in London and won a team gold in the 3 mile and an individual silver in the 1500 metres race. He was the first man to run a sub four minute 1,500 metres, with a time of 3:59.8 in May 1908.

At the 1908 Olympics Wilson won his 1500 m semi-final in a time of 4:11.4; his time in the final was 4:03.6, fractions of a second behind Melvin Sheppard. He was also part of Britain's five-man gold medal-winning team in the three-mile race. He was Britain's fourth man home in fifth place overall. His teammates were Archie Robertson, Norman Hallows, Joe Deakin and William Coales.

The following year, Wilson was in Queens, New York, competing alongside Sheppard. He spent the 1909 season in the U.S., and was considered one of the best mile runners. The same year he turned professional and raced in Australia and South Africa. On 29 November 1915 he enlisted as a Private in the West Yorkshire Regiment, serving overseas during World War I. He later emigrated to South Africa, where he died in 1932 aged 47.

References

Further reading

 
 

1885 births
1932 deaths
British male middle-distance runners
Athletes (track and field) at the 1908 Summer Olympics
Olympic athletes of Great Britain
Olympic silver medallists for Great Britain
Olympic gold medallists for Great Britain
People from Horncastle, Lincolnshire
Medalists at the 1908 Summer Olympics
Olympic gold medalists in athletics (track and field)
Olympic silver medalists in athletics (track and field)